Truly, Madly, Deeply is a 1990 British fantasy drama film made for the BBC's Screen Two series, by BBC Films, Lionheart and Winston Pictures. The film, written and directed by Anthony Minghella, stars Juliet Stevenson and Alan Rickman.

Plot
Nina, an interpreter, is beside herself with grief at the recent death of her boyfriend, Jamie, a cellist. When she is on the verge of despair, Jamie reappears as a "ghost" and the couple are reunited. Nina is ecstatic.

But Jamie tells her about his days while she is at work, and one dialogue suggests she should embrace the life around her; one of these is about a memorial plaque in a park about a dead child and how parents who read it feel an immediate, compelling need to hug their children.

The returned Jamie also reminds her that he also irritated her, and as a ghost he manifests behaviours she'd have little patience for – turning up the central heating to stifling levels, moving furniture around and inviting back "ghost friends" to watch videos. This infuriates her, and their relationship deteriorates.

She meets Mark, a psychologist, to whom she is attracted, but she is unwilling to become involved with him because of Jamie's continued presence. Nina continues to love Jamie but is conflicted by his self-centered behaviour and ultimately wonders out loud, "Was it always like this?" Over Nina's objections, Jamie decides to leave to allow her to move on.

Towards the end of the film, Jamie watches Nina leave and one of his fellow ghosts asks, "Well?" and Jamie responds, "I think so... Yes." At this point the central conceit of the movie has become clear: Jamie came back specifically to help Nina get over him by tarnishing her idealized memory of him.

Cast

Production
Minghella said he wrote the script specifically as "a vehicle for [Stevenson] to express all her talents. She plays piano, likes dancing and has a quirky side to her which she usually can't express in the classical parts she is asked for." The title comes from a word game played by the main characters, in which they challenge each other to by turns repeat and add to a series of adverbs describing the depths of their mutual affection. The working title for the film was 'Cello', a reference not only to the cello within the film, but also to the Italian word 'cielo' for heaven. The film was made-for-TV, and produced in a 28-day shooting schedule for just $650,000.

It was shot on location in London and Bristol, with external shots in Highgate and on the South Bank. Stevenson said in 2012 that it was the favourite role of her career, commenting that the shoot was like a party.

Reception
The film was critically successful, winning several awards including a BAFTA for best original screenplay. (Alan Rickman and Juliet Stevenson received Best Actor and Best Actress, and Anthony Minghella Most Promising Newcomer, from the 1991 Evening Standard British Film Awards.) It became a hit in the American arthouse circuit and Minghella subsequently was offered work by every major studio in Hollywood. The film's combination of serious themes with comic scenes, music and strong performances from the actors was noted by critics. Roger Ebert called it "a Ghost for grownups" (a common comparison because of the shared theme of lovers returning as ghosts and the concurrent releases of the films) and considered the film to reveal "some truths that are, the more you think about them, really pretty profound".

Review aggregator Rotten Tomatoes reports a 76% approval rating based on 37 reviews, with an average rating of 6.8/10. The website's critics consensus reads: "Largely thanks to charming performances from Alan Rickman and Juliet Stevenson, Truly Madly Deeply is an afterlife romance with infectious spirit." At Metacritic, the film has a weighted mean score of 72 out of 100 based on 16 reviews.

Awards and nominations

See also
List of ghost films

References

External links
 
 Truly, Madly, Deeply at BFI

1990s fantasy drama films
1990 romantic drama films
BBC Film films
British fantasy drama films
British romantic drama films
Films about the afterlife
Films directed by Anthony Minghella
Films about music and musicians
British ghost films
British independent films
1990s romantic fantasy films
Films whose writer won the Best Original Screenplay BAFTA Award
Films about grieving
1990s supernatural films
1990 films
Films shot in Bristol
Films shot in London
1990 independent films
1990s English-language films
1990s British films